Listed: Dispatches from America's Endangered Species Act is a 2011 book by Joe Roman that explores the history of the Endangered Species Act and the relationship between biodiversity and human well being. Healthy ecosystems, such as mangroves and dunes, for example, can act as barriers to natural catastrophes. The book received the 2012 Rachel Carson Environment Book Award from the Society of Environmental Journalists.

References

2011 non-fiction books
Popular science books
Harvard University Press books